The  Vänersborg Church is a church building in the central parts of Vänersborg, Sweden. Belonging to the Vänersborg and Väne-Ryr Parish of the Church of Sweden, it was built between 1783 and 1784. It was inaugurated on 5 August 1784.

References

External links

1784 establishments in Sweden
18th-century Church of Sweden church buildings
Churches in Västra Götaland County
Churches completed in 1784
Vänersborg
Churches in the Diocese of Skara